Gavin Allen (born 30 March 1965) is an Australian former rugby league footballer who played in the 1980s and 1990s.  He played club football in the Brisbane Rugby League premiership for Fortitude Valley and in the NSWRL premiership for the St. George Dragons and Brisbane Broncos, achieving selection to play for Queensland in State of Origin series, and London Broncos.

Career
Hailing from Cairns, Queensland, Gavin Allen started his career with Brisbane's Fortitude Valley Diehards before moving to Sydney's St George Dragons for the 1987–88 seasons. Returning to Queensland for the 1989 Brisbane Broncos season, and although not big for a front-rower, Allen's exceptionally high workrate made him a vital component of the Broncos' forward pack from 1990. Allen made his interstate representative debut when selected on the bench for Game I of the 1991 State of Origin series, becoming Queensland State of Origin player No. 72.

Allen played a major part in the Broncos forward pack that dominated St George in the 1992 grand final.  After taking part in the club's win over Wigan in the World Club Challenge, Allen was a non-playing reserve in the Broncos return bout with the Dragons in the 1993 grand final. With Glenn Lazarus, Andrew Gee and Mark Hohn competing, however, Allen found it very difficult at this time to maintain his first-grade berth.

In 1995, Allen's career was winding down but had a brief reprieve when - by now a fringe first-grader - he was the only Bronco not signed by Super League.  Consequently, Paul Vautin picked him up and chose him for the three State of Origin games, in which his experience and workrate helped players like Gary Larson and Billy Moore win Queensland a totally unexpected cleansweep. Allen retired at the end of the season.

Personal life
Gavin's son Josh plays for the Canberra Raiders NSW Cup side.

References

External links

Queensland Representatives at qrl.com.au

1965 births
Living people
Brisbane Broncos players
Fortitude Valley Diehards players
London Broncos players
Queensland Rugby League State of Origin players
Rugby league players from Cairns
Rugby league props
St. George Dragons players